Rudisha is a surname of Kenyan origin. Notable people with the surname include:

David Rudisha (born 1988), Kenyan world champion and record holder over 800 meters
Daniel Rudisha (born 1945), Kenyan 400 meters runner and Olympic medalist, father of David

Surnames of Kenyan origin